Holy Fellowship Episcopal Church is an historic Carpenter Gothic Episcopal church built in 1886 near Greenwood on the Yankton Indian Reservation in Charles Mix County, in the U.S. state of South Dakota. In 1975 it was added to the National Register of Historic Places.

The missionary church was established following 1869 invitation of the Yankton Sioux.

It is one-story building with a cruciform plan.  Most of its windows are topped by paired lancet arches.

See also

 List of Registered Historic Places in South Dakota

References

External links
 Episcopal Diocese of South Dakota website
 List of burials in Holy Fellowship Episcopal Cemetery

Churches on the National Register of Historic Places in South Dakota
Episcopal churches in South Dakota
Churches in Charles Mix County, South Dakota
Carpenter Gothic church buildings in South Dakota
Architecture in South Dakota
National Register of Historic Places in Charles Mix County, South Dakota